Antliff is a surname. Notable people with the surname include:

Allan Antliff, American anarchist and writer
William Antliff (1848–1909), English cricketer